Arthur Farre FRS (6 March 1811, in London – 17 December 1887, in London) was an English obstetric physician.

Life
Farre was the younger son of Dr John Richard Farre of Charterhouse Square, London. He was born in London on 6 March 1811 and was educated at Charterhouse School and at Caius College, Cambridge. After studying medicine at St. Bartholomew's Hospital, he graduated MB at Cambridge in 1833 and MD in 1841, and he became a fellow of the Royal College of Physicians in 1843. In 1836–7 he lectured on comparative anatomy at St Bartholomew's, and from 1838 to 1840 on forensic medicine. In 1841 he succeeded Dr. Robert Fergusson as professor of obstetric medicine at King's College, and physician-accoucheur to King's College Hospital, which offices he held till 1862. At the College of Physicians he was in succession censor, examiner, and councillor, and was Harveian orator in 1872. For twenty-four years (1852–1875) he was examiner in midwifery to the Royal College of Surgeons, resigning with his colleagues William Overend Priestley and Robert Barnes in protest at Sophia Jex-Blake and other women being admitted to the college examination in midwifery, on the grounds that they were otherwise qualified in medicine or surgery. Since no suitable successors were willing to be examiner, his effort was successful in the short term – though it encouraged parliamentary intervention, in the form of the Russell Gurney Act of 1876, which empowered licensing bodies to admit women for medical qualifications.

Farre was a successful fashionable obstetrician: he attended the Princess of Wales and other members of the royal family, and was made physician extraordinary to The Queen. On the death of Sir Charles Locock in 1875, Farre was elected honorary president of the Obstetrical Society of London, to which he gave a collection of pelves and gynæcological casts.

Farre died in London on 17 December 1887, and was buried at Kensal Green on 22 December. He left no children, and his wife died before him.

Works
His main contribution to medical literature was his article on ‘The Uterus and its Appendages,’ constituting parts 49 and 50 of Robert Bentley Todd's Cyclopædia of Anatomy and Physiology, issued in 1858. He contributed papers on microscopy to the Royal Microscopical Society's Journal and Transactions, and was president of the society in 1851–2. An early microscopical paper of his, 'On the Minute Structure of some of the Higher Forms of Polypi' (Philosophical Transactions, 1837), secured his election to the Royal Society in 1839.

References

1811 births
1887 deaths
19th-century English medical doctors
Medical doctors from London
People educated at Charterhouse School
Alumni of Gonville and Caius College, Cambridge
Fellows of the Royal College of Physicians
Fellows of the Royal Society
Fellows of the Royal Microscopical Society
English medical writers
19th-century English non-fiction writers
English obstetricians
Burials at Kensal Green Cemetery
Physician-accoucheurs